Jeera Aloo is a typical vegetarian Indian dish which is often served as a side dish and normally goes well with hot puris, chapatti, roti or dal. Its main ingredients are potatoes (aloo), cumin seeds (jeera) and Indian spices. Other ingredients are red chili powder, ginger, coriander powder, curry leaves, vegetable oil and salt. In its traditional form the dish is not hot, but it could be spiced up by adding powdered cayenne pepper. Other variations of the dish make use of sweet potatoes instead of regular ones.

See also
 List of Indian dishes
 List of potato dishes

References

External links
 Jeera Aloo Recipe. India Times.
Jeera Aloo Recipe At Home Easy Way . Cookmint

Potato dishes
Indian vegetable dishes
Punjabi cuisine
Vegetarian dishes of India